The NGC 5866 Group is a small group of galaxies located in the constellation Draco.  The group is named after NGC 5866, the galaxy with the highest apparent magnitude in the group, although some galaxy group catalogs list NGC 5907 as the brightest member.

Members
The table below lists galaxies that have been consistently identified as group members in the Nearby Galaxies Catalog, the Lyons Groups of Galaxies (LGG) Catalog, and the three group lists created from the Nearby Optical Galaxy sample of Giuricin et al.

Other possible members galaxies (galaxies listed in only one or two of the lists from the above references) include NGC 5866B, NGC 5963, UGC 9776, and UGC 9816.

Nearby groups
The NGC 5866 Group is located to the northwest of both the M101 Group (which contains the Pinwheel Galaxy (M101) and its companion galaxies) and the M51 Group (which contains the Whirlpool Galaxy (M51), the Sunflower Galaxy (M63), and several other galaxies).  The distances to these three groups (as determined from the distances to the individual member galaxies) are similar, which suggests that the M51 Group, the M101 Group, and the NGC 5866 Group are actually part of a large, loose, elongated structure.  However, most group identification methods (including those used by the references cited above) identify these three groups as separate entities.

See also
 Leo Triplet - another small group of galaxies

References

External links

 
Virgo Supercluster
Draco (constellation)
Galaxy clusters